The sole was a unit of currency in Argentina and Bolivia during the 19th century, equivalent to the real. The name sole was used alongside real in Argentina, whilst in Bolivia it replaced the real in 1827 and circulated until decimalization in 1864.

Modern obsolete currencies